Viljar Veski (born April 29, 1986) is retired Estonian basketball player. Viljar Veski played center position. Veski has also been a member of the Estonia national basketball team since 2008.

Honours
 2008–09 Estonian Cup (BC Kalev/Cramo)
 2008–09 Estonian League (BC Kalev/Cramo)

References

External links
 Profile at bctarvas.ee

1986 births
Living people
BC Kalev/Cramo players
Centers (basketball)
Estonian men's basketball players
Korvpalli Meistriliiga players
BC Rakvere Tarvas players
BC Valga players
Basketball players from Tallinn
Estonian expatriate basketball people in Spain